Ceci is an Italian surname that literally means "chickpeas". It may also be a given name. It is not to be confused with the French demonstrative pronoun ceci. Notable people with the name include:

Surname
Cody Ceci (born 1993), Canadian ice hockey player
Parri Ceci (born 1961), former Canadian football player
Stephen J. Ceci, American psychologist
Vincenzo Ceci (born 1964), former Italian cyclist
Joe Ceci (born 1957), Canadian politician
Jesse Ceci (1924–2006), American violinist
Davide Ceci (born 1993), Italian track cyclist
Louis J. Ceci (born 1927), American jurist and legislator
Francesco Ceci (born1989), Italian racing cyclist
Luca Ceci (born 1993), Italian track cyclist

Given name
Ceci Bastida, Mexican singer-songwriter
Ceci Velasquez, American politician
Ceci Krasimirova (born 1980), Bulgarian fashion model
Ceci Hopp (born 1963), American track and field athlete

Italian-language surnames